Events in the year 1934 in Turkey.

Parliament
 4th Parliament of Turkey

Incumbents
President – Kemal Atatürk
Prime Minister – İsmet İnönü

Ruling party and the main opposition
 Ruling party – Republican People's Party (CHP)

Cabinet
7th government of Turkey

Events
9 February – Balkan Pact 
4 March – Ankara Radio began broadcasting
14 June – Resettlement Law
21 June – Surname Law
24 November – Atatürk surname for Mustafa Kemal
5 December – Women's suffrage (general and local elections)

Births
5 March – Halit Refiğ, movie director
23 April – Fikret Hakan, actor
30 March – Mahmut Atalay, wrestler
2 August – Oktay Sinanoğlu, academic, chemist
10 August – Tevfik Kış, wrestler
21 August – İzzet Günay, actor
20 September – Hamit Kaplan, wrestler

Deaths
5 March – Reşit Galip, MD, politician
15 April – Kemalettin Sami (born in 1884), retired general
29 June – Zaro Aga (born in 1777),  allegedly the World's oldest man

Gallery

References

 
Years of the 20th century in Turkey
Turkey
Turkey
Turkey